Halpe zema, the zema banded ace, is a species of skipper, a butterfly belonging to the family Hesperiidae. It is native to Nepal, India, and Myanmar.

Taxonomy
The species was first described by William Chapman Hewitson in 1877.

The subspecies of Halpe zema found in India is:

 Halpe zema zema Hewitson, 1877 – Sikkim zema banded ace

Description

The wingspan of Halpe zema reaches .

Edward Yerbury Watson in his 1891 Hesperiidae Indica described the butterfly as:

Distribution and habitat
The zema banded ace is distributed from Nepal to Arunachal Pradesh, north-east India, and Myanmar. It is also found in Sikkim, West Bengal, Assam and the northern part of Myanmar.

It is common except during the cold winter months. March to November is their approximate flight period. It is mostly found in the high hilly forest that receives heavy rainfall annually. The flight of this species is very strong and rapid with very wary movement. Males are sometimes spotted near the hill streams or wet rock. Females are rarely seen.

References

Astictopterini
Butterflies of Asia